CRANN, the Centre for Research on Adaptive Nanostructures and Nanodevices, is Ireland's first purpose-built research institute whose purpose is to perform nanoscience research. It is housed in the Naughton Institute on the campus of Trinity College Dublin.  is the Irish word for tree.

The three major research areas are Nano-Biology of Cell Surface Interactions, Bottom-Up Fabrication and Testing of Nanoscale Integrated Devices, and Magnetic Nano-Structures and Devices.

CRANN is currently led by its director, Prof. Stefano Sanvito, along with deputy director  Prof. John Donegan, & executive director Dr. Lorraine Byrne. Previously, the management team consisted of Prof. John Boland (Director), Prof. Mike Coey (Deputy Director), Dr. Jussi Tuovinen (Executive Director).

The research teams are led by principal investigators from Trinity College including John Pethica, who is the director of the Naughton Institute.

References

External links
 

Trinity College Dublin